Patience or The Cards of Death is a 1920 German silent film directed by Felix Basch and Paul Leni and starring Conrad Veidt, Adele Sandrock, and Wilhelm Diegelmann. It was produced by Gloria-Film, a company later taken over by UFA.

The film's sets were designed by Paul Leni.

Cast
Conrad Veidt as Sir Percy Parker
Felix Basch as Edward
Adele Sandrock as Ahne
Irmgard Bern as Jane
Wilhelm Diegelmann as Fischer Tom
Karl Platen as Pfarrer

Loni Nest
Marga von Kierska
Max Winter

References

External links

Films of the Weimar Republic
German silent feature films
Films directed by Felix Basch
Films directed by Paul Leni
German black-and-white films
1920s German films